This partial list of city nicknames in Massachusetts compiles the aliases, sobriquets, and slogans that cities and towns in Massachusetts are known by (or have been known by historically), officially and unofficially, to municipal governments, local people, outsiders or their tourism boards or chambers of commerce. City nicknames can help in establishing a civic identity, helping outsiders recognize a community or attracting people to a community because of its nickname; promote civic pride; and build community unity. Nicknames and slogans that successfully create a new community "ideology or myth" are also believed to have economic value. Their economic value is difficult to measure, but there are anecdotal reports of cities that have achieved substantial economic benefits by "branding" themselves by adopting new slogans.

Some unofficial nicknames are positive, while others are derisive. The unofficial nicknames listed here have been in use for a long time or have gained wide currency.

  Amesbury – Carriagetown
Athol – Tool Town
Attleboro – Jewelry Capital of America or Jewelry Capital of the WorldAttleboro Massachusetts- The  Jewelry Capital of the World, Guyot Brothers Company, Inc. website, accessed September 17, 2011
Belmont – Town of Homes 
Boston
Athens of America –  Boston Brahmins' reference to the numerous cultural institutions which separated Boston from its counterparts Also called the Modern Athens.
Beantown or Bean Town and variations 'The Bean', 'DA BEAN', BeanCity, B-town, etc.Why do they call Boston "Beantown"?, Ask Yahoo? website, September 5, 2001Norman Dalager, "What's in a nickname?", Boston.com website, accessed June 18, 2008
The Hub (or the Hub of the Universe)
City of Notions
The Cradle of Liberty
Puritan City
Brockton – The City of Champions
Cambridge – The People's Republic of Cambridge
Chicopee
Crossroads of New England
Kielbasa Capital of the WorldO'Brien, George (2001), "Stretching the Imagination in Chicopee," BusinessWest, October 1, 2001: p. 14: "The city once known merely as the kielbasa capital of the universe now has much more on its plate."
Duxbury – Deluxebury 
Fall River – Scholarship City
Fitchburg – The Dirty Burg
Foxboro - The Gem of Norfolk County
Framingham – The Dirty Ham or The Ham
Gardner
Chair City: "By 1837 they were turning out so many chairs that residents immodestly dubbed the place "Chair City of the World."
Furniture Capital of New England
Hadley – Asparagus Capital of the World
Hingham
Blingham
Cha-chingham
Holyoke
Birthplace of Volleyball 
Paper City
Leominster – Pioneer Plastics City of the World
Lexington – The Birthplace of American Liberty
 Lowell 
 The Mill City
 City of Spindles
 Manchester of America
Marshfield - Marshvegas 
Natick – Home of Champions
 New Bedford – The Whaling City
 Newburyport – Clipper City
 Newton – The Garden City
 North Adams – The Tunnel City
 North Andover – Turkey Town
 Northampton
 Hamp
 NoHo
 The Paradise of America or The Paradise City
 Orange - Friendly Town, Jump Town
 Peabody – Leather City, Tanner City
 Plymouth – America's Hometown
 Provincetown 
 Like Nowhere Else
 P-Town
 Quincy 
 City of Presidents 
 Granite City
 Salem
 City of Peace
 City of Witches or The Witch City
Sandwich – Sangy
Scituate – The Irish Riviera
Sharon – Cowtown
 Somerville – Slummerville
 Springfield
 Birthplace of Basketball
 City of FirstsSpringfield , Economic Development Council of Western Massachusetts
 City of HomesChoose Springfield, Massachusetts, website accessed November 19, 2011
 City of ProgressThe City Of Progress, Winchester Square Springfield, MA
The City in a Forest 
 Garden Spot of the East
 The Metropolis of Western New England
Stoughton – Toughtown
Taunton
 The Christmas City
City of Firsts
 The Silver City
Tewksbury – Tewksvegas
Waltham – Watch City
Wareham – The Gateway to Cape Cod
Westfield – The Whip City
Westford – The 'Ford
Williamstown – The Village Beautiful
Winchendon – Toy Town USA
 Worcester
The Heart of the Commonwealth
City of Seven Hills
Wormtown
Paris of the 80's
The Woo

See also
List of city nicknames in the United States
List of cities in Massachusetts
Tofu Curtain of Western Massachusetts

References

External links
a list of American and a few Canadian nicknames
U.S. cities list

Massachusetts
Populated places in Massachusetts
Massachusetts culture
City nicknames